Ian Gordon Murray  (born 18 June 1946 in Durban, Union of South Africa), is a South African-British designer of Formula One racing cars for Brabham and McLaren and the McLaren F1 high-performance road car. Founder and CEO of Gordon Murray Design and Gordon Murray Automotive he has subsequently designed and built a number of sports cars and a variety of other automotive vehicles.

Early life
Born to Scottish immigrant parents, Murray was born and grew up in Durban, South Africa. His father was a motorcycle racer and later prepared racing cars. Murray studied mechanical engineering at Natal Technical College, now Durban University of Technology. He built and raced his own car, the IGM Ford, in the South African National Class during 1967 and 1968.

Formula One career

Brabham: 1969–1986
Murray moved to England in 1969, hoping to find a job at Lotus Cars. But Murray was offered a job at Brabham after coincidentally meeting then Brabham designer Ron Tauranac. When Bernie Ecclestone took over the Brabham team, he appointed Murray Chief Designer. There Murray designed many Grand Prix cars, some of which were World Championship Grand Prix winners. These designs include the extraordinary BT46B, also known as "the Brabham fan car", as well as the World Championship winning BT49 and BT52. Murray developed a reputation for an innovative approach to design, applied not only to car concepts and details but also to race strategy.

Between 1973 and 1985 Murray's Brabhams scored 22 Grand Prix wins, finished 2nd in the Constructors' Championship in 1975 and 1981, and gave Nelson Piquet Drivers' Championships in 1981 and 1983. For the  season, Murray designed the radical and highly ambitious low-line Brabham BT55, lowering overall ride height by inclining the engine and placing the driver in a recumbent position. However, the car was not a success, finishing only seven of the sixteen races in the season.

List of Brabham Formula One cars designed by Gordon Murray

Brabham BT42 (1973–1974)
Brabham BT44 (1974)
Brabham BT44B (1975)
Brabham BT45 (1976)
Brabham BT45B (1977)
Brabham BT45C (1978)
Brabham BT46B (1978)
Brabham BT46C (1978)
Brabham BT46 (1979)
Brabham BT48 (1979)
Brabham BT49 (1979–1980)
Brabham BT49B (1980)
Brabham BT49C (1981–1982)
Brabham BT50 (1981–1982)
Brabham BT49D (1982)
Brabham BT52 (1983)
Brabham BT52B (1983)
Brabham BT53 (1984)
Brabham BT54 (1985–1986)
Brabham BT55 (1986)

McLaren: 1987–1991
In 1986 Murray received an offer from Ron Dennis to join McLaren as Technical Director, taking over the role formerly held by John Barnard. Murray brought his Brabham experience and the BT55 low-line concept into the McLaren design team, led by Steve Nichols, working on the MP4/4 car for the 1988 season. This Honda turbo-powered engine car won 15 of the season's 16 Grands Prix, and gave Ayrton Senna his first Drivers' Championship. In the Constructors' Championship McLaren's points score of 199 was (at that time) an all-time high. Murray also oversaw the design of the naturally-aspirated engined 1989 MP4/5 and 1990 MP4/5B with lead designer Neil Oatley. The MP4/5 and MP4/5B won the driver's and constructor's championships in both years. Over the period 1988–91 the McLaren team won four consecutive Constructors' and Drivers' Championships: Alain Prost won the Drivers' Championship in 1989, Senna won further Drivers' Championships in 1990 and 1991.

McLaren Cars
From 1991 to 2004, Murray headed the offshoot McLaren Cars team to design road-going supercars such as the McLaren F1.

Gordon Murray Design
In July 2007 the Gordon Murray Design consultancy was established, and released initial details regarding its upcoming T.25 (Type 25) prototype city car along with mention of a future lightweight, economical supercar project. The T25 would be smaller than a Smart Fortwo.

On 17 November 2008 Gordon Murray won the 'Idea of the Year' accolade at Autocar magazine's annual awards ceremony for the manufacturing process for the T.25.

In November 2009 Gordon Murray Design and Zytek Automotive announced plans to develop an electric-powered version, the T.27. The car being a product of a partnership between Murray's company and British technology company Zytek, in charge of building the powertrain.

A celebration of 50 years of Murray's involvement in the car industry was held called One Formula. Every one of Murray's F1 designs was on display along with the McLaren F1 roadcar and examples from his personal car collection, along with hundreds of rock band T-shirts that Murray had amassed over the years. The book One Formula - 50 years of car design details Murray's designs.

On 4 August 2020, Murray announced the T.50 sports car, the "logical successor" to the McLaren F1 and incorporating the "fan car" concept of the Brabham BT46B, to be launched in 2022.

On 27 January 2022, Gordon Murray Automotive announced the T.33 super car. A twin-seater 'day to day' super car with the same engine from the T.50, but built on a new platform to be used by three other future cars.

Other projects
In 1981, Murray was involved in improvements for Midas Cars.

Murray independently designed the Rocket, an ultra-lightweight, open cockpit roadster powered by a 1-litre motorcycle engine, which has an appearance similar to that of a 60's era Grand Prix car. Looking like a single-seater, it could accommodate a passenger in tandem with the driver, the second seat located beneath a removable cover. The Rocket was built by former racing driver Chris Craft at the Light Car Company.

In September 2016 it was announced that Murray had been appointed to develop the OX truck, a flat pack low-cost vehicle, for the British charity Global Vehicle Trust (GVT). GVT founded OX Delivers to utilise the design to make last-mile transport more accessible and reliable in emerging markets. Murray created four experimental prototypes; XP1-XP4. XP2, XP3, and XP4 are owned by OX Delivers, with two of the vehicles having been converted to fully-electric trucks. XP1 is owned by Murray for his private collection. 

From 2015, Murray collaborated with TVR to design the upcoming TVR models, with the TVR Griffith released in 2017.

Honours
His alma mater, Durban University of Technology, made Gordon Murray an Honorary Professor in 2002 and awarded him an honorary doctorate in 2011.
In the 2019 New Year Honours list Murray was awarded a CBE for services to motoring.
In 2022 Murray was awarded the inaugural FIA President's Innovation Medal, 'for his constant innovative approach to race and road car design'.

References

External links
Official website of Gordon Murray Design 
ROAD & TRACK magazine: "Anatomy of a Supercar" – An article where Murray gives his opinion about the Bugatti Veyron.
(CNN) Former F1 Engineer Unveils New City Car --retrieved 28 June 2010
Channel 4 web site – Gordon Murray's ultra-lightweight microcar: first details.

1946 births
Living people
People from Durban
White South African people
South African people of Scottish descent
South African automobile designers
McLaren people
Formula One designers
Plug-in hybrid vehicle industry
South African motorsport people
Commanders of the Order of the British Empire
Durban University of Technology alumni